Comin' Home to Stay is the ninth studio album by American country music artist Ricky Skaggs. It was released in 1988 via Epic Records. The album peaked at number 12 on the Billboard Top Country Albums chart.

Track listing
"I'm Tired" (Buck Peddy, Webb Pierce, Mel Tillis) – 2:38
"Hold Whatcha Got" (Jimmy Martin) – 3:10
"(Angel on My Mind) That's Why I'm Walkin'" (Melvin Endsley, Stonewall Jackson) – 2:52
"Home Is Wherever You Are" (Wayland Patton) – 3:33
"If You Don't Believe the Bible" (Carl Jackson, Glenn Sutton) – 2:57
"San Antonio Rose" (Bob Wills) – 4:07
"Lord, She Sure Is Good at Lovin' Me" (Paul Overstreet, Randy Travis) – 2:55
"Old Kind of Love" (Overstreet) – 3:29
"Thanks Again" (Jim Rushing) – 3:36
"Woman You Won't Break Mine" (Hunter Moore, Rushing) – 3:32

Personnel 
 Ricky Skaggs – lead vocals, acoustic guitar, harmony vocals (1, 2, 7, 8, 10), electric guitar (1, 2, 10), bus driver (2), mandolin (4, 10)
 Mike Rojas – acoustic piano (1-4, 6, 7, 8, 10)
 Steve Gibson – electric guitar (4, 7), banjo (10)
 Carl Jackson – acoustic guitar (5)
 Terry Crisp – pedal steel guitar (1, 3, 6, 7, 8)
 Lloyd Green – pedal steel guitar (4, 10)
 J.D. Crowe – banjo (2)
 Jerry Douglas – dobro (2)
 Jesse Chambers – bass (1-4, 6, 7, 8, 10)
 Mike Kennedy – drums (1, 2, 3, 6, 7)
 Eddie Bayers – drums (4, 8, 10)
 Bobby Hicks – fiddle (1, 2, 3, 6, 7)
 Mark O'Connor – fiddle (10)
 Sharon White-Skaggs – lead vocals (4), harmony vocals (4, 7)
 The Whites – harmony vocals (5)
 Chris Austin – harmony vocals (6)
 Wayland Patton – harmony vocals (6)

Production 
 Ricky Skaggs – producer 
 Ed Seay – engineer, mixing 
 Tom Harding – assistant engineer, mix assistant 
 Scott Hendricks – assistant engineer, mix assistant 
 Danny Johnston – assistant engineer, mix assistant 
 Mike Poole – assistant engineer, mix assistant 
 Denny Purcell – mastering at Georgetown Masters (Nashville, Tennessee)
 Bill Johnson – art direction 
 Rollow Welch – art assistance
 Tania Owen – hand tinting 
 Jim "Señor" McGuire – photography 
 Bobbie Phillips – lettering

Chart performance

References

1988 albums
Ricky Skaggs albums
Epic Records albums
Albums produced by Ricky Skaggs